Maxime Collard (born 27 July 1983) is a French Olympic equestrian athlete. Collard competed at the Young Riders European Championships in 2006 and 2007 in Stadl-Paura and Nussloch. In 2016 she made her international debut on Grand Prix level. 

Collard represented France at the Olympic Games in Tokyo.

References

1983 births
Living people
French female equestrians
French dressage riders
Equestrians at the 2020 Summer Olympics
Olympic equestrians of France